Pooraka railway station was located approximately 12.9 km by rail from Adelaide on the former  long Northfield branch line that opened in June 1857. The station opened as Abattoirs railway station on 12 July 1913, when the adjacent Gepps Cross Abattoirs also opened.

History 

The station's name was changed to Pooraka in 1940, matching the name of the then sparsely populated suburb nearby.

Pooraka was a busy location, conducting livestock movements in and out of the adjacent abattoirs and sale yards.

Pooraka closed as an attended station in October 1982 and closed to passenger services on 29 May 1987. Some cattle trains still used the nearby stock ramp sidings until the early 1990s. The signal cabin and station shelter were demolished;  both platforms were still in place, heavily overgrown.

References

External links
 Pooraka station
 Northfield railway line - Pooraka
 Pooraka station (ruins)

Disused railway stations in South Australia
Railway stations in Australia opened in 1913
Railway stations closed in 1987
1987 disestablishments in Australia